A list of films produced by the Bollywood film industry based in
Mumbai in 1957:

Highest-grossing films
The ten highest-grossing films at the Indian Box Office in 1957:

A-C

D-L

M-O

P-Z

References

External links

 Bollywood films of 1957 at the Internet Movie Database

 Indian Film Songs from the Year 1957 - A look back at 1957 with a
special focus on Hindi film songs
Listen to songs from Bollywood films of 1957

1957
Bollywood
Films, Bollywood